Old Tappan is a borough in northern Bergen County, in the U.S. state of New Jersey. As of the 2020 United States census, the borough's population was 5,888, an increase of 138 (+2.4%) from the 2010 census count of 5,750, which in turn reflected an increase of 268 (+4.9%) from the 5,482 counted at the 2000 census.

Old Tappan was incorporated as a borough by an act of the New Jersey Legislature on October 18, 1894, from portions of Harrington Township, based on the results of a referendum held two days earlier. The borough was formed during the "Boroughitis" phenomenon then sweeping through Bergen County, in which 26 boroughs were formed in the county in 1894 alone. On April 23, 1896, additional territory was annexed from Harrington Township. The borough's name is derived from the Tappan tribe of Native Americans.

Geography

According to the United States Census Bureau, the borough had a total area of 4.163 square miles (10.78 km2), including 3.315 square miles (8.59 km2) of land and 0.848 square miles (2.20 km2) of water (20.38%).

One of only four confluence points in New Jersey, the 41°N 74°W crossing, is in Old Tappan on watershed property owned by United Water.

The borough is bordered to the north by the hamlets of Pearl River and Tappan in the town of Orangetown in Rockland County, New York. Lake Tappan and the Hackensack River are on the western side of the town, bordering River Vale. Harrington Park is to the south and Northvale and Norwood are to the east.

Demographics

2010 census

The Census Bureau's 2006–2010 American Community Survey showed that (in 2010 inflation-adjusted dollars) median household income was $125,435 (with a margin of error of +/− $30,643) and the median family income was $158,140 (+/− $27,026). Males had a median income of $90,536 (+/− $18,555) versus $61,875 (+/− $9,686) for females. The per capita income for the borough was $58,673 (+/− $7,319). About 2.4% of families and 2.4% of the population were below the poverty line, including 0.8% of those under age 18 and none of those age 65 or over.

Same-sex couples headed 8 households in 2010, an increase from the 6 counted in 2000.

2000 census
As of the 2000 United States census there were 5,482 people, 1,778 households, and 1,541 families residing in the borough. There were 1,804 housing units at an average density of 558.6 per square mile (215.6/km2). The racial makeup of the borough was 82.69% Caucasian, 15.63% Asian, 0.60% African American, 0.05% Native American, 0.44% from other races, and 0.58% from two or more races. Hispanics or Latinos of any race were 2.75% of the population.

In 2000, there were 1,778 households, out of which 42.6% had children under the age of 18 living with them, 77.7% were married couples living together, 6.7% had a female householder with no husband present, and 13.3% were non-families. 12.1% of all households were made up of individuals, and 6.1% had someone living alone who was 65 years of age or older. The average household size was 3.02 and the average family size was 3.28.

In the borough the population was spread out, with 27.0% under the age of 18, 5.9% from 18 to 24, 24.3% from 25 to 44, 28.3% from 45 to 64, and 14.6% who were 65 years of age or older. The median age was 41 years. For every 100 females, there were 92.4 males. For every 100 females age 18 and over, there were 89.0 males.

The median income for a household in the borough was $102,127, and the median income for a family was $106,772. Males had a median income of $77,635 versus $48,047 for females. The per capita income for the borough was $48,367. About 1.0% of families and 1.8% of the population were below the poverty line, including 0.9% of those under age 18 and 3.1% of those age 65 or over.

Parks and recreation
Old Tappan Golf Course is a nine-hole golf course located on DeWolf Road. The golf course is a private club that is open to the public. Stone Point Park is located on Westwood Avenue and is the site of many community events such as Town Day. Stone Point has four baseball fields, two basketball courts, a playground, a seasonal skate park, and four soccer fields. Oaks Park is a small park on Central Avenue with a small walking trail. It is the site of the borough's annual Halloween Parade. There is also a little league field called Gallagher Field, which was renamed in 2006 for Edward J. Gallagher, who had served as the borough's mayor for 16 years; The field is located on Charles Place near the elementary and middle school. There is also a track and football field as well as a dozen tennis courts at the high school that are open to the general public.

Government

Local government
Old Tappan is governed under the Borough form of New Jersey municipal government, which is used in 218 municipalities (of the 564) statewide, making it the most common form of government in New Jersey. The governing body is comprised of a Mayor and a Borough Council, with all positions elected at-large on a partisan basis as part of the November general election. A Mayor is elected directly by the voters to a four-year term of office. The Borough Council is comprised of six members elected to serve three-year terms on a staggered basis, with two seats coming up for election each year in a three-year cycle. The Borough form of government used by Old Tappan is a "weak mayor / strong council" government in which council members act as the legislative body with the mayor presiding at meetings and voting only in the event of a tie. The mayor can veto ordinances subject to an override by a two-thirds majority vote of the council. The mayor makes committee and liaison assignments for council members, and most appointments are made by the mayor with the advice and consent of the council. This seven-member governing body enacts local ordinances, levies municipal taxes, conducts the affairs of the borough and in almost all cases, can review and approve the actions of other borough boards, committees and agencies. The Mayor and Borough Council conducts all of it business during monthly meetings open to the public. All legislative powers of the Borough are exercised by the Mayor and Council in the form of a resolution, ordinance or proclamation.

, the Mayor of Old Tappan is Republican John M. Kramer, whose term of office ends December 31, 2023. Members of the Old Tappan Borough Council are Ron E. Binaghi Jr. (R, 2023), William R. Boyce IV (R, 2025), Guy J. Carnazza (R, 2024), Thomas E. Gallagher (R, 2023), Cort Gwon (R, 2025) and Jin Yhu (R, 2024).

In June 2019, the Borough Council selected Jin Yhu from three candidates nominated by the Republican municipal committee to fill the seat expiring in December 2021 that had become vacant following the resignation of Anna Haverilla, who took office as the Borough Administrator; Yhu, the borough's first Korean-American councilmember, served on an interim basis until the November 2019 general election, when voters elected him to serve the balance of the term of office.

In February 2016, the Borough Council selected Thomas Gallagher from three candidates nominated by the Republican municipal committee to fill the council seat expiring in December 2017 that was vacated by John Kramer when he took office as mayor. Gallagher will serve until the November 2016 general election, when voters will select a replacement to fill the balance of the term of office.

Federal, state and county representation
Old Tappan is located in the 5th Congressional District and is part of New Jersey's 39th state legislative district.

Politics
As of March 2011, there were a total of 3,821 registered voters in Old Tappan, of which 749 (19.6% vs. 31.7% countywide) were registered as Democrats, 1,015 (26.6% vs. 21.1%) were registered as Republicans and 2,057 (53.8% vs. 47.1%) were registered as Unaffiliated. There were no voters registered to other parties. Among the borough's 2010 Census population, 66.5% (vs. 57.1% in Bergen County) were registered to vote, including 91.5% of those ages 18 and over (vs. 73.7% countywide).

In the 2016 presidential election, Republican Donald Trump received 1,663 votes (53.3% vs. 41.6% countywide), ahead of Democrat Hillary Clinton with 1,365 votes (43.7% vs. 54.8%) and other candidates with 94 votes (3.0% vs. 3.0%), among the 3,150 ballots cast by the borough's 4,318 registered voters (28 ballots were spoiled), for a turnout of 72.9% (vs. 73.0% in Bergen County). In the 2012 presidential election, Republican Mitt Romney received 1,792 votes (61.8% vs. 43.5% countywide), ahead of Democrat Barack Obama with 1,072 votes (37.0% vs. 54.8%) and other candidates with 23 votes (0.8% vs. 0.9%), among the 2,898 ballots cast by the borough's 4,040 registered voters, for a turnout of 71.7% (vs. 70.4% in Bergen County). In the 2008 presidential election, Republican John McCain received 1,736 votes (56.3% vs. 44.5% countywide), ahead of Democrat Barack Obama with 1,309 votes (42.4% vs. 53.9%) and other candidates with 17 votes (0.6% vs. 0.8%), among the 3,084 ballots cast by the borough's 3,986 registered voters, for a turnout of 77.4% (vs. 76.8% in Bergen County). In the 2004 presidential election, Republican George W. Bush received 1,690 votes (56.2% vs. 47.2% countywide), ahead of Democrat John Kerry with 1,289 votes (42.9% vs. 51.7%) and other candidates with 20 votes (0.7% vs. 0.7%), among the 3,006 ballots cast by the borough's 3,848 registered voters, for a turnout of 78.1% (vs. 76.9% in the whole county).

In the 2013 gubernatorial election, Republican Chris Christie received 74.8% of the vote (1,174 cast), ahead of Democrat Barbara Buono with 24.6% (386 votes), and other candidates with 0.6% (10 votes), among the 1,590 ballots cast by the borough's 3,933 registered voters (20 ballots were spoiled), for a turnout of 40.4%. In the 2009 gubernatorial election, Republican Chris Christie received 1,201 votes (61.0% vs. 45.8% countywide), ahead of Democrat Jon Corzine with 671 votes (34.1% vs. 48.0%), Independent Chris Daggett with 72 votes (3.7% vs. 4.7%) and other candidates with 6 votes (0.3% vs. 0.5%), among the 1,969 ballots cast by the borough's 3,921 registered voters, yielding a 50.2% turnout (vs. 50.0% in the county).

Emergency services

Police
The Old Tappan Police Department is a full-time professional department that provides police services to the Borough of Old Tappan. , there are a total of 13 members of the department: one Chief, one Lieutenant, two Sergeants, and nine Officers.

The force is responsible for all aspects of policing in the borough, including responding to fire and medical emergency calls. Each patrol car is equipped with a first aid kit, oxygen tank, and an automated external defibrillator.

Dispatching is provided by the 9-1-1 call center at the River Vale Police Department as part of an interlocal arrangement that dates back to the early 1970s or earlier.

Officers of the Old Tappan Police Department are members of Pascack Valley Local 206 of the New Jersey State Policemen's Benevolent Association.

Fire
The Old Tappan Volunteer Fire Department (OTVFD) is an all-volunteer fire department. Established in 1932, the department consists of one Chief, one Deputy Chief, one Captain, and four Lieutenants. In addition, there is a Fire Marshal who heads the Old Tappan Bureau of Fire Prevention. The department is staffed by approximately 55 fully trained firefighters, and is a municipal-run public volunteer fire department that is funded by taxes. Dispatching is provided by the 9-1-1 call center at the River Vale Police Department.

The OTVFD has one station, located at 231 Old Tappan Road. The station houses two pumpers, Engine 64 (first due) and Engine 62, one tower ladder, Ladder 63, and one rescue unit, Rescue 61.

Ambulance

The Old Tappan First Aid Corps (OTFAC) was started in 1939, and is located at 4 Russell Avenue. The corps is run by administrative officers, line officers, and Trustees. The administrative officers are the President, Vice President, Treasurer, Assistant Treasurer, Recording Secretary, Corresponding Secretary, and Financial Secretary. The line officers are the Captain, 1st Lieutenant, and 2nd Lieutenant. The OTFAC is an all-volunteer independent public emergency medical service. As such, they do not bill for services, and their equipment is not directly paid for by the borough. Funding is provided by donations and support from the borough.

The corps provides basic life support, and is staffed primarily by certified Emergency Medical Technicians. CPR-trained drivers are also sometimes on duty. They have two Type III ambulances, Ambulance 66 and Ambulance 68. Dispatching is provided by the 9-1-1 call center at the River Vale Police Department.

The primary jurisdiction of the OTFAC is the Borough of Old Tappan, but the corps also regularly responds to requests for mutual aid from the neighboring First Aid Squads of River Vale, Emerson, Washington Township, Westwood, Hillsdale, and Tri-Boro (Park Ridge, Woodcliff Lake, and Montvale).

The OTFAC is a member of the New Jersey State First Aid Council, the Pascack Valley Volunteer Ambulance Association and the Pascack Valley Mutual Aid Group.

Education
The Old Tappan Public Schools serve students in kindergarten through eighth grade. As of the 2018–19 school year, the district, comprised of two schools, had an enrollment of 655 students and 61.2 classroom teachers (on an FTE basis), for a student–teacher ratio of 10.7:1. Schools in the district (with 2018–19 enrollment data from the National Center for Education Statistics) are 
T. Baldwin Demarest Elementary School with 346 students in grades K–4 and 
Charles DeWolf Middle School with 294 students in grades 5–8.

Students in public school for ninth through twelfth grades attend Northern Valley Regional High School at Old Tappan, together with students from Harrington Park, Northvale and Norwood, along with students from Rockleigh who attend the high school as part of a sending/receiving relationship. As of the 2018–19 school year, the high school had an enrollment of 1,170 students and 97.9 classroom teachers (on an FTE basis), for a student–teacher ratio of 12.0:1. The school is one of the two schools of the Northern Valley Regional High School District, which also serves students from the neighboring communities of Closter, Demarest and Haworth at the Northern Valley Regional High School at Demarest. During the 1994–1996 school years, Northern Valley Regional High School at Old Tappan was awarded the Blue Ribbon School Award of Excellence by the United States Department of Education.

Public school students from the borough, and all of Bergen County, are eligible to attend the secondary education programs offered by the Bergen County Technical Schools, which include the Bergen County Academies in Hackensack, and the Bergen Tech campus in Teterboro or Paramus. The district offers programs on a shared-time or full-time basis, with admission based on a selective application process and tuition covered by the student's home school district.

Transportation

Roads and highways

Main roads include Old Tappan Road, Washington Avenue, Westwood Avenue, and Orangeburg Road.

Public transportation
Rockland Coaches provides service on routes 14ET to the Port Authority Bus Terminal in Midtown Manhattan.

Notable people

People who were born in, residents of, or otherwise closely associated with Old Tappan include:

 Robert Auth (born 1956), politician who represents the 39th Legislative District in the New Jersey General Assembly
 Joe Benigno (born 1953), sports radio personality on WFAN
 David Berkowitz (born 1949), professional bridge player
 Lisa Berkowitz (born 1952), professional bridge player
 P. J. Byrne (born 1974), film and television actor of Horrible Bosses, Final Destination 5 and The Legend of Korra
 Al Di Meola (born 1954), jazz fusion guitarist
 Sophia Eckerson (–1954), botanist and microchemist
 Joe Ferriero (born 1957), former chairman of the Bergen County Democratic Organization
 Vincent "The Chin" Gigante (1928–2005), a New York mobster who headed the Genovese crime family
 Jon Hensley (born 1965) and Kelley Menighan Hensley (born 1967), husband and wife actors who had appeared together on the daytime soap opera As the World Turns
 Robert A. Lewis (1918–1983), co-pilot of the Enola Gay
 Jeffrey Maier (born 1984), best known as the young fan who deflected a ball in play during Game 1 of the 1996 American League Championship Series between the New York Yankees and the Baltimore Orioles
 Kenyon Martin (born 1977), professional basketball player for the Denver Nuggets
 Mike Milo (born 1965), Emmy Award-winning animator, director, storyboard artist, writer and producer in the television industry
 Rob Segedin (born 1988), professional baseball player for the Los Angeles Dodgers

Historic sites
Old Tappan is home to the following locations on the National Register of Historic Places:

 Frederick Haring House – Old Tappan and De Wolf Roads (added 1983)
 Gerrit Haring House – 224 Old Tappan Road (added 1983)
 Teunis Haring House – 70 Old Tappan Road (added 1979)
 Haring-DeWolf House – 95 De Wolf Road (added 1983)

See also
 List of U.S. cities with significant Korean-American populations

References

Sources 

 Municipal Incorporations of the State of New Jersey (according to Counties) prepared by the Division of Local Government, Department of the Treasury (New Jersey); December 1, 1958.
 Clayton, W. Woodford; and Nelson, William. History of Bergen and Passaic Counties, New Jersey, with Biographical Sketches of Many of its Pioneers and Prominent Men., Philadelphia: Everts and Peck, 1882.
 Harvey, Cornelius Burnham (ed.), Genealogical History of Hudson and Bergen Counties, New Jersey. New York: New Jersey Genealogical Publishing Co., 1900.
 Van Valen, James M. History of Bergen County, New Jersey. New York: New Jersey Publishing and Engraving Co., 1900.
 Westervelt, Frances A. (Frances Augusta), 1858–1942, History of Bergen County, New Jersey, 1630–1923, Lewis Historical Publishing Company, 1923.

External links

 Old Tappan official website
 Old Tappan Public Schools
 
 Data for Old Tappan Public Schools, National Center for Education Statistics
 Northern Valley Regional High School District
 Old Tappan Golf Course Information

 
1894 establishments in New Jersey
Borough form of New Jersey government
Boroughs in Bergen County, New Jersey
Populated places established in 1894
New Jersey populated places on the Hackensack River